From March 8 to June 7, 1960, voters of the Democratic Party elected some of the delegates to the 1960 Democratic National Convention. The presidential primaries were inconclusive, as several of the leading contenders did not enter them, but U.S. Senator John F. Kennedy emerged as the strongest candidate and won the nomination over Lyndon B. Johnson at the Convention, held from July 11 to 15 in Los Angeles. 

Several major candidates served as Democratic Party nominees, with John F. Kennedy serving as the nominee for 1960, Johnson in 1964, and Humphrey in 1968.

Primary race
Recalling the experience of 1928 Catholic Democratic presidential nominee Al Smith, many wondered if anti-Catholic prejudice would affect Kennedy's chances of winning the nomination and the election in November. To prove his vote-getting ability, Kennedy challenged Minnesota Senator Hubert Humphrey, a liberal, in the Wisconsin primary. Although Kennedy defeated Humphrey in Wisconsin, the fact that his margin of victory came mostly from heavily Catholic areas left many party bosses unconvinced of Kennedy's appeal to non-Catholic voters. Kennedy next faced Humphrey in the heavily Protestant state of West Virginia, where anti-Catholic bigotry was said to be widespread. Humphrey's campaign was low on money and could not compete with the well-organized, well-financed Kennedy team. Kennedy's attractive sisters and brothers combed the state looking for votes, leading Humphrey to complain that he "felt like an independent merchant running against a chain store."  On primary day, Kennedy crushed Humphrey with over 60% of the vote. Humphrey withdrew from the race and Kennedy had gained the victory he needed to prove to the party's bosses that a Catholic could win in a non-Catholic state. In the months leading up to the Democratic Convention, Kennedy traveled around the nation persuading delegates from various states to support him. However, as the Convention opened, Kennedy was still a few dozen votes short of victory.

Although Kennedy won primaries by comfortable margin, his main opponent, Senate Majority Leader Lyndon B. Johnson, who did not participate in primaries, had a very strong base in party establishment and gained many delegates. Johnson did not join any primary, but was a write-in.

Candidates 
The following political leaders were candidates for the 1960 Democratic presidential nomination:

Major candidates
These candidates participated in multiple state primaries or were included in multiple major national polls.

Competing in primaries

Bypassing primaries
The following candidates did not place their name directly on the ballot for any state's presidential primary, but may have sought to influence to selection of un-elected delegates or sought the support of uncommitted delegates.

Favorite sons
The following candidates ran only in their home state's primary or caucus for the purpose of controlling its delegate slate at the convention and did not appear to be considered national candidates by the media.

Governor Ross Barnett of Mississippi
Governor Pat Brown of California (pledged support to Kennedy)
Governor Michael DiSalle of Ohio (pledged support to Kennedy)
Governor Herschel Loveless of Iowa
George H. McLain of California
Albert S. Porter of Ohio
Senator George Smathers of Florida

Declined to run
The following persons were listed in two or more major national polls or were the subject of media speculation surrounding their potential candidacy, but declined to actively seek the nomination.

Senator Joseph Clark of Pennsylvania
Former Governor Frank G. Clement of Tennessee
Governor Orval Faubus of Arkansas
Senator Albert Gore of Tennessee
Former Governor W. Averell Harriman of New York
Senator Estes Kefauver of Tennessee
Governor Edmund Muskie of Maine
Governor G. Mennen Williams of Michigan

Polling

National polling

Two-way races 
Kennedy v. Kefauver

Kennedy v. Johnson

Kennedy v. Stevenson

Johnson v. Symington

Statewide polling

West Virginia

Wisconsin

Debates

Humphrey-Kennedy debate
On May 4, 1960, Humphrey and Kennedy took part in a televised one-on-one debate at WCHS-TV in Charleston, West Virginia, ahead of the state's primary.

Primaries

States by winner

Total popular vote

Total number of vote in primaries:

candidates:
 John F. Kennedy - 1,847,259 (31.43%)
 Hubert Humphrey - 590,410 (10.05%)
 Unpledged delegates - 241,958 (4.12%)
 Wayne Morse - 147,262 (2.51%)
 Adlai Stevenson - 51,833 (0.88%)
"Favorite Sons:"
 Pat Brown - 1,354,031 (23.04%)
 George H. McLain - 646,387 (11.00%)
 George Smathers - 322,235 (5.48%)
 Michael DiSalle - 315,312 (5.37%)

Convention

Presidential nomination 

Presidential tally:

 John F. Kennedy: 806 (52.89%)
 Lyndon B. Johnson: 409 (26.84%)
 Stuart Symington: 86 (5.64%)
 Adlai Stevenson: 80 (5.25%)
 Robert B. Meyner: 43 (2.82%)
 Hubert Humphrey: 42 (2.76%)
 George Smathers: 30 (1.97%)
 Ross Barnett: 23 (1.51%)
 Herschel C. Loveless: 2 (0.13%)
 Pat Brown, Orval E. Faubus, Albert Dean Rosellini: each 1 vote

Vice-presidential nomination 

Kennedy announced Lyndon B. Johnson as his choice of running-mate on the afternoon following his nomination. Johnson was nominated by acclamation that evening.

See also
 1960 Republican Party presidential primaries

Notes

References